The Reclaimed Wood Council was a trade association that promoted reclaimed wood from old buildings or from logs reclaimed from rivers. The Council was formed in May 2003 and dissolved in January 2008.

References

Forestry organizations
Trade associations based in the United States
Year of establishment missing
Year of disestablishment missing
2003 establishments in the United States
2008 disestablishments in the United States
Forestry in the United States